is the eighth single by Japanese music trio Candies. Written by Machiko Ryū and Kōichi Morita, the single was released on December 5, 1975.

The song peaked at No. 11 on Oricon's singles chart and sold over 172,000 copies.

Track listing 
All lyrics are written by Machiko Ryū; all music is written by Kōichi Morita; all music is arranged by Kōji Ryūzaki.

Chart positions

Cover versions
 The Nolans covered the song in English as "Ace of Hearts" in their 1991 album Tidal Wave (Samishii Nettaigyo).
 Yukana Nogami, Mayumi Iizuka, and Yuri Shiratori covered the song as the second ending theme of the 1995 anime OVA series Hyper Doll.
 The Cover Song Dolls covered the song in their 2007 self-titled debut album.
 ManaKana covered the song in their 2009 album Futari Uta 2.

References

External links 
 
 
 

1975 singles
1975 songs
Japanese-language songs
Candies (group) songs
Sony Music Entertainment Japan singles
Songs written by Koichi Morita (songwriter)